Marche is one of the 20 regions of Italy.

Marche may also refer to:

Places

Belgium
 Marche (Chamber of Representatives constituency) 1831–1900
 Marche-en-Famenne, Wallonia
 Marche-les-Dames, Wallonia

Italy
 Marche (Chamber of Deputies constituency)
 Marche (Milan Metro), a railway station
 Marche (Turin Metro), a railway station
 Marche Airport, Ancona
 Marche Polytechnic University, Ancona

United States
 Marche, Arkansas

People with the surname
 Antoine-Alfred Marche (1844–1898), French naturalist and explorer
 Roger Marche (1924–1997), French footballer
 Stephen Marche (born 1976), Canadian writer

Other uses
 32 Infantry Division Marche, a unit of the Italian Army during World War II
 Marche Radiuju, a character in the tactical role-playing game Final Fantasy Tactics Advance

See also
 
 
 
 Marches, Drôme, a commune in France
 La Marche (disambiguation)
 March (disambiguation)
 Marcha (disambiguation)